Alessia is an Italian given name, the feminine form of the male given name  Alessio, the Italian form of Alexius. It is a popular name for females in Italy and was the second most popular name for Italian girls born in 2006. The name may mean "defending warrior". The name-day for Alessia is January 9th, the day the French Catholic Saint Alix Le Clerc, who is also known as Alessia Le Clerc, died in 1622.

Individuals with the given name Alessia

Alessia Amenta, Italian archaeologist and Egyptology curator at the Vatican Museums
Alessia Cara (born 1996), Canadian singer-songwriter
Alessia Fabiani (born 1976) Italian model, showgirl and TV presenter
Alessia Filippi (born 1987), Italian swimmer
Alessia Leclerc, French Catholic Saint (also known as Alix Leclerc)
Alessia Leolini (born 1997), Italian artistic gymnast
Alessia Marcuzzi (born 1972), Italian television host and actress
Alessia Merz (born 1974), Italian model, television host and showgirl
Alessia Patuelli (born 2002), Italian racing cyclist
Alessia Rovegno (born 1998), Peruvian model, actress, singer, and beauty pageant titleholder who was crowned Miss Peru 2022
Alessia Russo (born 1999), English footballer
Alessia Russo (gymnast) (born 1996), Italian gymnast
Alessia Tuttino (born 1983), Italian football midfielder
Alessia Zecchini (born 1992), Italian free-diver

Notes

Italian feminine given names